Autonomous Agents and Multi-Agent Systems is a peer-reviewed scientific journal covering the study of autonomous agents and multi-agent systems.

It is published bimonthly by Springer Science+Business Media and is the official journal of the International Foundation for Autonomous Agents and Multiagent Systems. According to the Journal Citation Reports, the journal has a 2020 impact factor of 1.431.

Autonomous Agents and Multi-Agent Systems was established in spring 1998 under founding editor-in-chief Katia Sycara (Carnegie Mellon University). The current editors-in-chief are Michael Luck (King’s College London) and Kate Larson (University of Waterloo).

Abstracting and indexing
Autonomous Agents and Multi-Agent Systems is abstracted and indexed in Science Citation Index Expanded, Scopus, Inspec, EBSCO databases, Academic OneFile, ACM Computing Reviews, ACM Digital Library, Computer Science Index, Current Abstracts, Current Contents/Engineering, Computing and Technology, and EI-Compendex.

References

External links 
 

Publications established in 1998
Computer science journals
Springer Science+Business Media academic journals
English-language journals
Bimonthly journals